This article lists the colonial governors of Togo. It encompasses the period when the country was under colonial rule of the German Empire (as Togoland), military occupation of the territory by the Allies of World War I (during the Togoland campaign of the African theatre), as well as the period when it was a Class B League of Nations mandate and a United Nations trust territory, under the administration of France (as French Togoland) and the United Kingdom (as British Togoland) respectively.

List

(Dates in italics indicate de facto continuation of office)

Togoland

Allied occupation of Togoland

French Togoland

For continuation after independence, see: List of presidents of Togo

British Togoland

For continuation after independence, see: List of heads of state of Ghana

See also
Togo
Politics of Togo
List of presidents of Togo
List of prime ministers of Togo
Lists of office-holders

External links
World Statesmen – Togo

Colonial governors
Colonial governors
Colonial governors
Colonial governors
Togo
Colonial governors
Togo